V 811 Hugo Homann was a German trawler which was converted into a Vorpostenboot for the Kriegsmarine during World War II. She was a part of the 8 Vorpostenflotille and participated in the German invasion of Norway. She was sunk by an air mine at the mouth of the Ems estuary on May 6, 1940.

References 

Auxiliary ships of the Kriegsmarine